Jacob Hvinden Haug (14 January 1880 – 2 June 1961) was a Norwegian military officer and grand master of the Norwegian Order of Freemasons.

He was born in Christiania. He was major general and commander of the Norwegian 2nd Division from 1936. During the Norwegian Campaign in the Second World War he was head of the operations at Mjøsa and in Gudbrandsdalen.

References

1880 births
1961 deaths
Military personnel from Oslo
Norwegian Army World War II generals
Norwegian Freemasons
Knights of the Order of Charles XIII